Gerard Wodarz (10 August 1913 – 8 November 1982) was one of the best football players of interwar Poland. He was a multiple champion of the country (representing Ruch Wielkie Hajduki, which in January 1939 became Ruch Chorzów) and also played 28 games on the Poland national football team, scoring 9 goals.

Biography
He was born in 1913 in Bismarckhütte (a settlement in Upper Silesia, which in January 1939 became part of the city of Chorzów), and died in 1982 in his hometown.

Wodarz was a left-wing forward player. His career started in Ruch Wielkie Hajduki, in which he played in the years 1926-1939 and after the war, in 1946-47. Together with Ernest Wilimowski and Teodor Peterek, was part of one of the best forward formations in the history of Ruch. In 183 games he scored 51 goals, and for five times was the Champion of Poland (1933–1936 and 1938).

On the national team of Poland he took part in 31 games. His debut occurred on 2 October 1932 in Bucharest, against Romania. Wodarz participated in the 1936 Summer Olympics in Berlin, where he scored 5 goals. Also, he represented Poland during one of the most famous games in Polish soccer history - against Brazil in Strasbourg, France, during the 1938 Football World Cup.

After the German Invasion of Poland in September 1939, Wodarz signed a German Nationality List (Volksliste) and played for a newly created team, Bismarckhütter SV 99 (which was based on the prewar Ruch Chorzów). In 1941 he was called up to the Wehrmacht and in 1944 he was captured by the U.S. Army. The Americans passed him to the Polish Armed Forces in the West, where he returned to soccer, playing for some British teams.

In 1946 he returned to Poland and for next two years represented Ruch Chorzów. His career ended in 1947. Later on he tried to coach several Upper Silesian teams, but without major achievements.

See also
Polish Roster in World Cup Soccer France 1938

References

1913 births
1982 deaths
Polish footballers
Ruch Chorzów players
Footballers at the 1936 Summer Olympics
Olympic footballers of Poland
1938 FIFA World Cup players
Polish military personnel of World War II
People from the Province of Silesia
Poland international footballers
Polish football managers
Górnik Zabrze managers
Ruch Chorzów managers
People from Chorzów
German prisoners of war in World War II held by the United States
Sportspeople from Silesian Voivodeship
Association football forwards
German Army personnel of World War II
Volksdeutsche